James Arthur Bennett (born 1947) is a retired museum curator and historian of science.

Career
Jim Bennett was educated at Grosvenor High School, Belfast, and Clare College, Cambridge, where he graduated with BA and PhD degrees in 1969 and 1974 respectively. He was Director of the Museum of the History of Science at Oxford University (since renamed the History of Science Museum). He was appointed on 1 October 1994, on the retirement of the previous director, Francis Maddison, and retired on 30 September 2012. He is also a fellow of the Faculty of History and Linacre College. In 2010, the University of Oxford gave him the title Professor of the History of Science. Previously he was a fellow and senior tutor of Churchill College and curator of the Whipple Museum of the History of Science, both part of Cambridge University. Since 2016, he's been the president of the Hakluyt Society. He also holds the position of Keeper Emeritus at the Science Museum, London

Bennett's interests lie in the history of practical mathematics from the 16th century to the 18th century, scientific instruments and astronomy. His work in Cambridge included hands-on use of scientific and navigational instruments, using the Whipple collection to teach undergraduates how instruments worked, and gaining insight into the difficulties faced by the historical teachers of those instruments.

Jim Bennett has been President of the British Society for the History of Science and President of the Scientific Instrument Commission of the International Union of History and Philosophy of Science. He has also appeared in television documentaries.

Selected publications
 The Divided Circle: A History of Instruments for Astronomy, Navigation and Surveying, Jim Bennett. Oxford, 1987.
 Church, State and Astronomy in Ireland, 200 Years of Armagh Observatory, Jim Bennett. Belfast, 1990.
 The Garden, the Ark, the Tower, the Temple. Biblical Metaphors of Knowledge in Early Modern Europe, Jim Bennett and S. Mandelbrote. Oxford, 1998.
 Practical Geometry and Operative Knowledge, Jim Bennett. Configurations, 6, 1998.
 London's Leonardo: The Life and Work of Robert Hooke, Jim Bennett, Michael Cooper, Michael Hunter and Lisa Jardine. Oxford University Press, 2003. .

As editor
 The Oxford Companion to the History of Modern Science, John L. Heilbron (editor-in-chief), Jim Bennett, Frederic L. Holmes, Rachel Laudan and Giuliano Pancaldi (eds). Oxford University Press, 2003. .

References

External links
 

1947 births
Living people
Alumni of Clare College, Cambridge
British curators
British historians
Fellows of Churchill College, Cambridge
Place of birth missing (living people)
Fellows of Linacre College, Oxford
Historians of science